is a Japanese politician of the Democratic Party of Japan, a member of the House of Representatives in the Diet (national legislature). A native of Chikushino, Fukuoka and graduate of the University of Tokyo, he was elected for the first time in 2003.

References

External links 
 Official website in Japanese.

1975 births
Living people
People from Chikushino, Fukuoka
Politicians from Fukuoka Prefecture
University of Tokyo alumni
Members of the House of Representatives (Japan)
Democratic Party of Japan politicians
Sumitomo Mitsui Financial Group
21st-century Japanese politicians